The California Ramblers were an American jazz group that recorded hundreds of songs for many different record labels throughout the 1920s. Four members of the band – Red Nichols, Jimmy Dorsey, Tommy Dorsey, and Adrian Rollini – went on to front big bands in later decades.

The band was formed in 1921 by banjoist Ray Kitchenman. Its members were from Ohio but chose the name California Ramblers. The band was instantly successful and were one of the most prolific recording groups in the 1920s. 

In late 1924 the Ramblers signed a contract with Columbia Records and then, in conjunction with their manager Ed Kirkeby, agreed to waive all royalties to Columbia for the right to record for other companies under pseudonyms. They recorded for nearly every independent label in the U.S., Canada, and the UK, using over 100 unique aliases, Including The Golden Gate Orchestra, Varsity Eight, Stokers of Hades, and The Goofus Washboards.

References

External links
 California Ramblers recordings at the Discography of American Historical Recordings.

Big bands
Dance bands
Vocalion Records artists
Musical groups established in the 1920s
Columbia Records artists